Gopynathan Velayudhan Nair Muralikrishnan (born 4 March 1972), professionally credited as Murali Gopy, is an Indian actor-screenwriter, producer, author, singer, lyricist, music composer and journalist. He has written critically acclaimed films like Ee Adutha Kaalathu, Left Right Left, Tiyaan, Kammara Sambhavam, and the highest-grossing Malayalam film Lucifer. He has won numerous awards including Filmfare Awards South and South Indian International Movie Awards.

Career

Journalist
Murali Gopy joined The New Indian Express in 1995, immediately after completing PG in Journalism at Institute of Journalism, Thiruvananthapuram, and worked as sub-editor and reporter there. Later, he joined The Hindu, as sub-editor and Features Editor. He then shifted base to UAE, and became chief sub-editor with Arab-Allied Media, Dubai, for the sports magazines Cleanbowled and Sports Today. In 2008, he was appointed chief editor of MSN India Entertainment. In 2012, he resigned the job to be more active in films. His writings on various topics can be found in his blog .

Author
Murali is a screenwriter and short story writer. He published his first short story "Ayur Rekha" in Kalakaumudi in 1991 at the age of 19. He has often stated that he started writing stories to bring a smile to his father, thespian Bharat Gopy, who was debilitated by a massive stroke in 1986. Murali Gopiyude Kadhakal, a compilation of his stories, has been published by Mathrubhumi Books, the third edition of which is now running. He has also sketched illustrations for The Hindu, Kalakaumudi and DC Books.

Screenwriter
Murali Gopy made his debut as a screenwriter, actor and singer in the Lal Jose movie Rasikan (2004). The 2012 film Ee Adutha Kaalathu, scripted by Murali, is considered a pathbreaker in Malayalam cinema, for its innovative method of weaving story threads together. It was opined to be "the cinema of 21st century" by stalwart writer N. S. Madhavan. His next screenplay was for Left Right Left, also directed by Arun Kumar Aravind. It is a social thriller set in three periods – the 60s/70s, the 80s/90s and the present. The movie, which opened to excellent reviews on its release, has since then been looked upon as a cult classic. The 2017 movie Tiyaan, written by him was noted for its bold theme that focused on the current socio-political scenario in India.  Kammara Sambhavam, scripted by him, combines black humour with satire and spoof. He scripted Lucifer, starring Mohanlal, and directed by Prithviraj Sukumaran.

Actor
Murali's debut acting role in Rasikan was as the villain Kala Bhaskaran. His notable performances include the role of Ajay Kurien, an impotent and abusive husband in Ee Adutha Kaalathu, Che Guevara Roy, a partially paralyzed left activist in Left Right Left, Father Michael Plathottathil a young priest in Kanyaka Talkies, the double role as Dr.Hari Narayan and Ravi Narayan in the psychological thriller 1 by Two, Devassy Pappan, an 80-year-old patriarch in Pa Va, Bhramaram, Mahashay Bhagvan, a self-proclaimed Godman in Tiyaan. As an actor, Murali has been praised for his attention to minute details and realistic acting style. His onscreen portrayals have won him many accolades including the 61st Filmfare Awards South for The Best Actor in a Supporting Role. Known to be greatly selective, Murali Gopy has worked only in a limited number of movies since his foray into the film industry in 2004.

Singer
Murali, who is passionate about his singing, has rendered songs for many films. His "The LRL Anthem" in Left Right Left, "Pakalinu Veyil" in 1 by Two, "Kalippu" in Premam and "Bham Bham Shiv Bole" in Tiyaan, were super hits. He has won Asiavision Movie Award for The New Sensation in Singing for "LRL Anthem".

Lyricist
Murali Gopy ventured into lyrics writing with the song "Neti" in Tiyaan, which describes the path to spiritual enlightenment. He has also written the Lucifer anthem song "Empuraane", which was sung by Usha Uthup.Also he written the theme song of the movie Theerppu called "Raavil"

Music Composer
Murali Gopy made his debut as a music composer with the song Raavil, for the movie Theerppu, which was also scripted and produced by him.

Personal life
Murali is the son of the actor Bharath Gopi and Jayalakshmy. He was married to Anjana Pillai, and has two children, Gowri and Gowrav. Anjana died at the age of 38, on 26 April 2015 after suffering a heart attack.

Murali has launched a website in memoriam to his father Bharath Gopi.

Awards

2019 – Ramu Kariat Award for the most popular screenwriter
2019 – Kalajyothi Award
2014 – Amrita Film Award for The Best Actor in Supporting Role
2014 – South Indian International Movie Awards for The Best Actor in Supporting Role
2014 – 61st Filmfare Awards South for The Best Actor in a Supporting Role
2014 – Jaihind Film Award for The Best Script
2014 – Yuva Award (2012–2013)
2013 – Thikkurissi Sukumaran Foundation Award for The Best Supporting Actor
2013 – Nana Film Award – Man of the Year
2013 – Asiavision Movie Award for The New Sensation in Singing
2013 – Asiavision Movie Award for The Best Screenplay
2013 – Santosham South India Film Awards for The Best Supporting Actor
2013 – Jaycey Foundation Award – Special Award
2013 – Jaihind Film Award – Special Jury Award
2013 – Vanitha Film Award for The Best Anti-Hero
2013 – Asianet Film Award for The Best Villain
2013 – Reporter Film Award for The Best Supporting Actor
2012 – P. Bhaskaran Foundation Award for The Best Story
2012 – Nana Film Award for the Best Script Writer
2012 – Asiavision Movie Award for The Best Anti-Hero
2012 – Asiavision Movie Awards for The New Sensation in Script
2012 – Mohan Raghavan Award for The Best Script Writer
2009 – The Sathyan Memorial Film Award for The Best Supporting Actor

Filmography

As actor

As Screenwriter

As producer

As Narrator

Discography

As singer

As Music composer

As lyricist

Author

Television

Radio

References

External links

Murali's blog vanguardvgm – the first to last, a compilation of his articles.

Living people
21st-century Indian male actors
Malayalam screenwriters
Journalists from Kerala
1972 births
Male actors from Thiruvananthapuram
Male actors in Malayalam cinema
Indian male film actors
Screenwriters from Thiruvananthapuram
South Indian International Movie Awards winners